Badarayana (IAST Bādarāyaṇa; Devanāgari बादरायण) was an Indian philosopher and sage who was the reputed author of Brahma Sutras, the source text for the Hindu philosophical school of Vedānta. Estimates of his lifetime vary very widely from around fifth century BCE to third or fourth century CE.

His work Brahma Sutras is variously dated from 500 BCE to 450 CE. The Brahma Sutras of Bādarāyana, also called the Vedanta Sutra, was compiled in its present form around 400–450 CE, but "the great part of the Sutra must have been in existence much earlier than that". Estimates of the date of Bādarāyana's lifetime differ between 200 BCE and 200 CE.

Bādarāyana is regarded as having written the basic text of the Vedanta system, the Vedāntasūtra a.k.a. Brahmasūtra. He is thus considered the founder of the Vedānta system of philosophy.

References

Sources

 
 
 

Vedanta
Hindu philosophers and theologians
Ancient Indian philosophers